"I'm alright, Jack" is a British expression used to describe people who act only in their own best interests, even if providing assistance to others would take minimal to no effort on their behalf. It carries a negative connotation, and is rarely used to describe the person saying it.

The expression was used in the title of the 1959 comedy film I'm All Right Jack. It also appears in the lyrics of the 1973 Pink Floyd song "Money", and is the name of a 2019 song by UB40 which satirises people who do not care about the less fortunate.

See also
 Just-world hypothesis

References

External links

 Collins Dictionary definition of "I'm all right, Jack"
 Macmillan Dictionary definition of "I'm all right, Jack"
 Oxford Dictionary definition of "I'm all right, Jack"

English phrases